The Dénomination Commune Française (DCF), or "Common French Denomination/Name" in English, is the formal French name for a drug.

See also
 International Nonproprietary Name (INN)
 Denominazione Comune Italiana (DCIT)
 United States Adopted Name (USAN)
 British Approved Name (BAN)
 Australian Approved Name (AAN)
 Japanese Accepted Name (JAN)

References

Naming conventions
Pharmacological classification systems